Hal Hoye (born September 18, 1957) is an American bobsledder. He competed at the 1984 Winter Olympics and the 1988 Winter Olympics.

References

External links
 

1957 births
Living people
American male bobsledders
Olympic bobsledders of the United States
Bobsledders at the 1984 Winter Olympics
Bobsledders at the 1988 Winter Olympics
Sportspeople from Jacksonville, Florida
20th-century American people
21st-century American people